Charles William Streit Jr. (June 1, 1884 – April 4, 1971) was an American football player, coach, and official.

College
Streit was a three-sport (football, track, and basketball) letterman at Auburn University, as well as at Washington and Lee University. At Auburn, he and Frank Jones stood out for Auburn at tackle.

Official
His first appearance officiating was in a Georgia–Georgia Tech game in which Streit claimed he may have seen the "first fake pass in the history of football in that game. The Georgia quarterback drifted back with something that looked like a football and gave it a long heave. It turned out to be his head guard. That, of course, would be illegal today, but it would still be just as funny."

He was the referee for the 1929 Rose Bowl in which Roy Riegels scooped up a Georgia Tech fumble and ran toward his own goal line. The two-point safety on the ensuing punt proved to be the margin of victory.

Streit also officiated Southeastern Conference track and field meets.

Olympics
He was one of six track managers on the U.S. Olympic teams that went to Paris (1924), Amsterdam (1928), Los Angeles (1932) and Berlin (1936). Bill was a member of the Executive Committee of the U.S. Olympics from 1948 to 1952.

In 1924, Streit was appointed chairman of the U.S: Olympic wrestling committee and that ' team became the first from the United States to win the Olympic wrestling title. That same year he also was named vice president of the- International Wrestling Association, the first American to hold the post. He was U.S. Olympic wrestling chairman in 1929, 1932 and 1936.

References

1884 births
1971 deaths
Auburn Tigers football players
Auburn Tigers men's basketball players
Auburn Tigers men's track and field athletes
College football officials
Samford Bulldogs football coaches
Washington and Lee Generals football players
Washington and Lee Generals men's basketball players
Basketball players from Birmingham, Alabama
Players of American football from Birmingham, Alabama
American men's basketball players